Kot pri Damlju is a small village in the Municipality of Črnomelj in southeastern Slovenia. Until 2000, the area was part of the settlement of Damelj. The village is part of the traditional region of White Carniola and is included in the Southeast Slovenia Statistical Region.

Geography
Kot pri Damlju is the southernmost settlement in Slovenia.

References

External links
Kot pri Damlju at Geopedia

Populated places in the Municipality of Črnomelj
Populated places established in 2000
2000 establishments in Slovenia